Craig Harbour is an abandoned settlement in the  Qikiqtaaluk Region, Nunavut, Canada.

In 1922, a Royal Canadian Mounted Police detachment was established at Craig Harbour, named in honour of Dr. John D. Craig, expedition commander. The site was selected as Smith Island protected the harbour from moving pack ice, and the nearby mouth of Jones Sound made the harbour's navigation accessible. The outpost was closed in the 1930s, and re-opened in 1951 at the start of the Cold War.

See also
List of communities in Nunavut

References

Ports and harbours of Nunavut
Ghost towns in Nunavut
Former populated places in the Qikiqtaaluk Region